The Ministry of Ceremonies was one of the nine ministries of the Chinese Han dynasty. The Minister of Ceremonies, also known as Grand Master of Ceremonies, was the chief official in charge of religious rites, rituals, prayers, and the maintenance of ancestral temples and altars. The role's title was changed to Upholder of Ceremonies from 195 to 144 BC before reverting to the original title. Although his main concern was to link the emperor with the supernatural world and Heaven, he was also given the task of setting educational standards for the Imperial University (est. 124 BC) and the academic chairs who specialized in the Five Classics, the canon of Confucianism.

One of the Minister of Ceremonies' many subordinates was the Court Astronomer (also known as the Prefect Grand Astrologer), who made astronomical observations and drafted the annual lunisolar calendar. The Court Astronomer also upheld a literacy test of 9,000 characters for nominees aspiring to become subordinate officials for either the Minister Steward or Palace Assistant Imperial Clerk. These nominees were often recommended subordinates of commandery-level Administrators. Other subordinates of the Minister of Ceremonies reported illegal acts at ancestral temples, prepared sacrificial offerings of food and wine at shrines and temples, and arranged for the music and dancing that accompanied ceremonies.

This would be the precursor to the Ministry of Rites during the Sui and Tang dynasties, and the State Administration for Religious Affairs in present-day China.

See also
 Government of the Han dynasty
 Ministry of Rites
 State Administration for Religious Affairs

References

Citations

Sources 

 
 
 
 

Government of Imperial China
Religion in China
Han dynasty